Alt Vinalopó (in Valencian) or Alto Vinalopó (in Spanish) is a comarca in the province of Alicante, Valencian Community, Spain.

Municipalities

The comarca contains seven municipalities, listed below with their areas and populations:

References
Proposta de demarcacions territorials homologades, Dirección General de Administración Local, Valencia, D.L. 1988. Conselleria d'Administració Pública. .

 
Comarques of the Valencian Community
Geography of the Province of Alicante